The 2003 Merapoh bus tragedy took place on 23 November 2003 when an Ekspres Mutiara (Pearl Express) bus collided with another bus at kilometre 63 of Lipis-Merapoh Road (Federal Route 8) near the Pahang-Kelantan border, Malaysia. 14 passengers were killed in this accident.
Among those killed were a two-year-old girl, eight women and five men.

References
 Express bus-school bus crashed: 14 killed - Besonline - Retrieved on 10 July 2007.

2003 disasters in Malaysia
Bus incidents in Malaysia
Merapoh Bus Tragedy, 2003
2003 in Malaysia